Arhopala fulla , the spotless oakblue, is a species of butterfly belonging to the lycaenid family described by  William Chapman Hewitson in 1862 . It is found in  Southeast Asia (Sikkim to Indonesia and the Philippines)

Subspecies
Arhopala fulla fulla (Buru, Ambon)
Arhopala fulla babsi Joicey & Talbot, 1917 (Waigeu, Misool, Papua, Tagula)
Arhopala fulla canulia (Hewitson, 1869) (Obi, Halmahera, Ternate)
Arhopala fulla prasia Fruhstorfer, 1914 (Amboina)
Arhopala fulla ignara Riley & Godfrey, 1921 (Burma, Mergui, southern Thailand)
Arhopala fulla andamanica (Wood-Mason & de Nicéville, 1881) (Andamans)
Arhopala fulla intaca Corbet, 1941 (southern Thailand, Peninsular Malaysia, Sumatra, Borneo)
Arhopala fulla santa (Evans, 1957) (Philippines: Luzon)

References

External links
"Arhopala Boisduval, 1832" at Markku Savela's Lepidoptera and Some Other Life Forms

Arhopala
Butterflies described in 1862
Taxa named by William Chapman Hewitson
Butterflies of Asia